Ursidibacter is a genus of bacteria from the class of Pasteurellaceae.

References

Pasteurellales
Bacteria genera